Parker Glasier (1849 – January 22, 1936) was a farmer, lumberman and political figure in New Brunswick. He represented Sunbury County in the Legislative Assembly of New Brunswick from 1899 to 1912 as a Conservative member.

He was born in Sunbury County, New Brunswick, the son of D.D. Glasier, and educated there and in Saint John. He was also a boat manager. Glasier married a Miss Blake. He ran unsuccessfully for a seat in the provincial assembly in 1896. Glasier also served on the county council and was county warden.

See also
Politics of New Brunswick

References 
 Canadian Parliamentary Guide, 1908, EJ Chambers

1849 births
1936 deaths
Canadian Baptists
Progressive Conservative Party of New Brunswick MLAs